Aleksandar Aleksandrov (born 30 July 1986), better known as Sasho Aleksandrov, is a Bulgarian professional footballer who plays for CSKA 1948. Mainly a right back, he can also play as a wingback.

Career

Early career
Sasho Aleksandrov began his career for Conegliano German, after initially playing for Septemvri Sofia as a youngster. He played 19 times for Conegliano before moving to Minyor Pernik in 2006.

Cherno More

On 8 January 2010, Aleksandrov signed for Cherno More Varna. He made his league debut in a 2–0 home win against Chernomorets Burgas on 1 March, playing the full 90 minutes.

On 17 October 2010, Sasho scored his first competitive goal for Cherno More against Slavia Sofia on his 20th league appearance for the club. He scored an 88th minute winning header in his side's 3–2 victory.

Aleksandrov started the 2012–13 season as a makeshift wide midfielder.

In December 2014, Aleksandrov left Cherno More after his contract expired in order to sign for Levski Sofia.

Levski Sofia
Aleksandrov signed with Levski Sofia on 8 January 2015 on a two-year deal. He made his A PFG debut for the "bluemen" on 27 February 2015, after coming on as a second-half substitute for Bozhidar Kraev in the 8:0 home rout against Haskovo. During his time with Levski he was nicknamed Sasho Alves by the fans because of the visual similarity with Dani Alves. He was released by the club in June 2017.

Etar
On 21 June 2017, Aleksandrov signed a 1-year contract with Etar.

Career stats

Honours
Slavia Sofia
 Bulgarian Cup (1): 2017–18

References

External links 
 Profile at LevskiSofia.info
 

1986 births
Living people
Footballers from Sofia
Bulgarian footballers
PFC Minyor Pernik players
PFC Beroe Stara Zagora players
PFC Cherno More Varna players
PFC Levski Sofia players
SFC Etar Veliko Tarnovo players
PFC Slavia Sofia players
FC CSKA 1948 Sofia players
FC Tsarsko Selo Sofia players
First Professional Football League (Bulgaria) players
Association football defenders